Pontus Ståhlkloo (born 5 June 1973) is a Swedish snowboarder. He competed in the men's halfpipe event at the 1998 Winter Olympics.

References

1973 births
Living people
Swedish male snowboarders
Olympic snowboarders of Sweden
Snowboarders at the 1998 Winter Olympics
People from Dalarna